Guo Chunfang (born 4 January 1979) is a Chinese athlete. She competed in the women's long jump at the 2000 Summer Olympics.

References

1979 births
Living people
Athletes (track and field) at the 2000 Summer Olympics
Chinese female long jumpers
Olympic athletes of China
Place of birth missing (living people)
21st-century Chinese women